Pernis is an above-ground metro station of the Rotterdam Metro Line C. The station is located in the village of Pernis, near the centre of Rotterdam.

The station was opened in November 2002, as a result of an extension of the East-West Line (also formerly called Caland line). This extension connected the former terminus Marconiplein to the North-South Line (also Erasmus line) at Tussenwater station.

Rotterdam Metro stations
Railway stations opened in 2002
2002 establishments in the Netherlands
Railway stations in the Netherlands opened in the 21st century